99th Regiment of 99th Infantry Regiment may refer to:

 99th Regiment of Foot (disambiguation), several units of the British Army

Union Army (American Civil War):
 99th Illinois Infantry Regiment
 99th Indiana Infantry Regiment
 99th New York Volunteer Infantry Regiment
 99th Ohio Infantry